Linja may refer to:
 a Finnish unit of measurement
Linja, a Finnish oil recovery ship
Bandar Lengeh, a city in Iran